The welterweight was the second-heaviest freestyle wrestling weight class held as part of the Wrestling at the 1904 Summer Olympics programme.  It was the first time the event, like all other freestyle wrestling events, was held in Olympic competition. Ten wrestlers competed.

Results

Jerry Winholtz and William Hennessy fought for the bronze medal after losing in this tournament against the gold medalist Charles Ericksen.

Sources

External links
 

Wrestling at the 1904 Summer Olympics